Bibiyoni (also, Bibinoni, Bibiyani, Bibiany, and Bibioni) is a village and municipality in the Lerik Rayon of Azerbaijan.  It has a population of 849.

References 

Populated places in Lerik District